Saitkulovo (Säyetqol) is a rural locality (a selo) and the administrative centre of Novopetrovsky Selsoviet, Kugarchinsky District, Bashkortostan, Russia. The population was 193 as of 2010. There are 2 streets.

Geography 
Saitkulovo is located 15 km southwest of Mrakovo (the district's administrative centre) by road. Bekeshevo is the nearest rural locality.

References 

Rural localities in Kugarchinsky District